Coenobita lila is a species of land hermit crab in the genus Coenobita Latreille, 1829 (Anomura: Coenobitidae). Coenobita lila is described from Singapore, Malaysia and Indonesia.

References

lila
Terrestrial crustaceans